John Cottle (born 11 August 1949) is a New Zealand former equestrian. He competed at the 1984 Summer Olympics and the 1988 Summer Olympics.

References

External links
 

1949 births
Living people
New Zealand male equestrians
Olympic equestrians of New Zealand
Equestrians at the 1984 Summer Olympics
Equestrians at the 1988 Summer Olympics
Sportspeople from Wellington City